Rashaad may refer to:

Rashaad Carter (born 1989), American football wide receiver
Jamaal RaShaad Jones Charles (born 1986), former American football running back
Rashaad Coward (born 1994), American football defensive tackle
Rashaad Duncan (born 1986), former American football defensive tackle
Rashaad Galant (1947–2014), South African cricketer
Rashaad Magiet (born 1979), South African cricketer
Joshua Rashaad McFadden, American visual artist and photographer
Rashaad Mosweu (born 1998), Botswana cricketer
Rashaad Newsome (born 1979), American artist
Rashaad Penny (born 1996), American football running back
Rashaad Powell (born 1981), American basketball coach and former player
Rashaad Reynolds (born 1991), American football cornerback
Rashaad Singleton (born 1987), American basketball player

See also
Rachaad White (born 1999), American football running back
Rashad
Rasheeda
Rashid (disambiguation)